Sir Alexander Colin Cole  FRHSC (Hon) (16 May 1922 – 18 February 2001) was a long serving officer of arms at the College of Arms in London.  Eventually, he would rise to the rank of Garter Principal King of Arms, the highest heraldic office in England.

Early life and education
Colin Cole was born in Surrey on 16 May 1922, the elder son of Edward Cole, a prosperous staples manufacturer. The family descends from John Cole, a yeoman in the parish of Twickenham, Middlesex, in the mid-17th century.

Cole was educated at Dulwich College (where his portrait stands in the stairwell to the Great Hall), Pembroke College, Cambridge, and Brasenose College, Oxford where he read Law. During World War II he served as a captain in the Coldstream Guards.

He was called to the bar at Inner Temple in 1949 and pursued a legal career before aspiring to be an officer of arms.

In 1944 Colin Cole married Valerie Card. They had four sons and three daughters.

Heraldic career
In 1953 Cole was Fitzalan Pursuivant Extraordinary at the coronation of Elizabeth II of the United Kingdom. Shortly after this, began his migration from the bar to the College of Arms. This came as a result of the revival, in 1954, of the High Court of Chivalry (which had not sat since 1737) to hear the case of Manchester Corporation versus Manchester Palace of Varieties for wrongfully displaying the city's coat of arms. Cole represented the Palace of Varieties but he lost the case.

After a short term as Fitzalan Pursuivant Extraordinary, Cole was appointed an officer in ordinary (a full member of the College of Arms) as Portcullis Pursuivant of Arms in Ordinary in 1957. He became Windsor Herald of Arms in Ordinary in 1966. Cole also served as the college's registrar and librarian from 1967 to 1974. He was appointed Garter Principal King of Arms four years later, in 1978 and held that position until 1992.

As Garter, Cole liberalised the rules devised by Sir Anthony Wagner for the admittance of new officers to the college. Previously they had always been university graduates who had also served a heraldic apprenticeship. Under Cole's leadership, this rule no longer applied and the majority of the pursuivants appointed had no pretensions to scholarship.

Cole's strong streak of shrewdness and worldly wisdom was deployed to the benefit of the college; its role was advanced when he was at the helm. His heraldic practice became the largest and most successful of the last century. His achievements and service to his sovereign led to Her Majesty appointing him both KCVO in 1988 and KCB in 1992: the two knighthoods being in her personal gift.

Many believe that Cole's chief achievement as Garter King of Arms was the part he played in the restoration of the College building. The structure of the building was overhauled and the brickwork and stone balustrades repaired under the direction of the estate agents Cluttons. This was one of the first times the repair of an important historic building had been entrusted to such a firm rather than to a specialist architect.

A member of the Court of Common Council from 1964, Cole became Sheriff in 1977 but had to turn down the opportunity to proceed to Lord Mayor as his duties as Garter would have clashed.  He was a Master of the Scriveners, Liveryman of the Basketmakers, and on the Court of the Painter Stainers Companies. He was also a very active freemason.

Coats of arms designed

Margaret Thatcher and Denis Thatcher

Honours and appointments
Colin Cole was appointed a Member of the Royal Victorian Order in 1977, was promoted to CVO in 1979, and KCVO in 1983.  He was also made a Knight Commander of the Order of the Bath in 1992.

Military in bearing and vocabulary, Cole was proud of his rank of Lieutenant-Colonel, RARO (Brevet 1973). Until his knighthood in 1983, he called himself Colonel Cole on the strength of his position in the Honourable Artillery Company. He was honorary Colonel, 6/7 Battalion, the Queen's Regiment, from 1981 to 1986, President of The Royal Society of St George from 1982 to 1998, and Knight Principal of the Imperial Society of Knights Bachelor from 1995.

Arms

References

See also
John Brooke-Little
The College of Arms
Heraldry

1922 births
2001 deaths
People from Surrey
Coldstream Guards officers
English officers of arms
Coats of arms designers
Knights Commander of the Order of the Bath
Knights Commander of the Royal Victorian Order
Alumni of Pembroke College, Cambridge
People educated at Dulwich College
British Army personnel of World War II
Garter Principal Kings of Arms